Veprecula sculpta is a species of sea snail, a marine gastropod mollusk in the family Raphitomidae.

Description
The length of the shell attains 21 mm.

The whorls are rather flatly convex, ribbed longitudinally, crossed by fine revolving lines. The ribs are rounded, rather compressed, leaving off near the suture. The outer lip is externally varicose. The color of the shell is yellowish, banded with light brown.

Distribution
This marine species occurs off Pacific Panama.

References

 Liu, J.Y. [Ruiyu] (ed.). (2008). Checklist of marine biota of China seas. China Science Press. 1267 pp

External links
  Bonfitto A. & Morassi M. (2013) New Indo-Pacific species of Rimosodaphnella Cossmann, 1916 (Gastropoda: Conoidea): a genus of probable Tethyan origin. Molluscan Research
 

sculpta
Gastropods described in 1843